The 2020–21 Presbyterian Blue Hose men's basketball team represented Presbyterian College during the 2020–21 NCAA Division I men's basketball season. The team was led by second-year head coach Quinton Ferrell, and played their home games at Templeton Physical Education Center in Clinton, South Carolina as members of the Big South Conference.

Previous season
The Blue Hose finished the 2019–20 season 10–22, 7–11 in Big South play to finish in a three-way tie for seventh place. They lost in the first round of the Big South tournament to Charleston Southern.

Roster

Schedule and results

|-
!colspan=12 style=|Regular season

|-
!colspan=9 style=|Big South tournament
|-

|-

References

Presbyterian Blue Hose men's basketball seasons
Presbyterian Blue Hose
Presbyterian Blue Hose men's basketball
Presbyterian Blue Hose men's basketball